Kutchi Memons, also spelled as Kutchi Memons, are an ethnic group or caste from Kutch in Gujarat, India, who speak the Kutchi language. They are related to the Memons associated with the historic state of Kathiwar, a Muslim community of Pakistan and India, who speak the Memon language. Transliteration of name of this Memon community has now been standardized. Hence popular usage is Cutchi and Kutchi.

History 
Kutchi Memons originally practiced Hinduism and converted to Islam under influence of Sunni pirs. Kutchi Memons migrated from Sindh to Kutch in Gujarat, a state of India, after their conversion to Islam in 1422 CE; the Memon belong to the Lohana community. Historically, Kutch was a princely state and this kingdom included Bhuj, Anjar, Lakhpath, Mandvi, etc. The Kutchi Memons are now spread all over India, as well as in the globe, where they form part of the Indian diaspora (cf. Kutchi Memons in Bombay). Though Kutchi Memons historically spoke Kutchi, use of this language has sharply declined, and many Kutchi Memons (particularly those who reside in urban areas) have adopted Urdu and other more dominant tongues.  
Scholars have conducted detailed studies about the origin and development of this community.

Kutchi Memons are a highly endogamous community, where marriages are arranged within their own ethnic group. Humeirah, a novel by Sabah Carrim, delves into the nitty-gritty details of the life of the fictitious eponymous character, a Kutchi Memon, and the pressures of an endogamous and ethnocentric community on her and other characters. The novel is set on the island of Mauritius where a community of about one thousand Kutchi Memons live. 

Kutchi Memons are a predominantly business community and are known for their Philanthropy. Being part of the Indian diaspora, the Kutchi Memons are spread all over India, as well as the globe and have erected many mosques all over the world. A large number of Kutchi Memons settled down in Kerala in 1815.

Population 
The total estimated population of Kutchi Memons as at 2020: 9.461 million

 Population of Kutchi Memon in India - 5.22 million
 Population of Kutchi Memon in Pakistan - 1.80 million
 Besides India and Pakistan; a large numbers of Kutchi Memons are also populated in the United Kingdom, Canada, USA, Bangladesh, Sri Lanka, Middle East, South Africa, Botswana, Tanzania, Namibia, Malawi, Kenya, Mauritius, Singapore, Burma and Australia - 2.44 million

Famous Kutchi Memon mosques

Kutchi Memon Masjid, Mangalore 
The Kutchi Memon Masjid, Mangalore (also known locally as the Katchi Palli) is located opposite the famous Bombay Lucky Restaurant in Mangalore. It was built in 1839 by Kutchi Memon spice traders from Gujarat. In 1930, this mosque was the first to get electric supply and the fourth to get electrified in Mangalore, during the British rule. It was also the first to use loudspeakers to call for Azan, and the first in Mangalore where the Friday sermon was delivered in Urdu.

Haji Sir Ismail Sait Masjid , Bangalore 
The Haji Sir Ismail Sait Masjid is located at Mosque Road, Fraser Town, Pulekeshinagar, Bengaluru, Bangalore Central Business District. It was built on land donated by Haji Sir Ismail Sait who was well known a businessman and philanthropist of Karnataka. The mosque was developed over the years to what it is today and has a capacity of approximately 3000 musallis or worshippers. It is on the way to the Bangalore International Airport and is frequently visited by people from all across the world. It also has a WAKF charitable medical assistance in its premises. The mosque vicinity also has a Karnataka Government Urdu school. The mosque is air conditioned. It has a library in the vicinity with a good collection of Islamic books and a guest house for Muslim guests travelling on Islamic work.

Many Islamic scholars have given their speeches at this mosque and it is visited by very educated people. The mosque has a small Islamic store at the gate. Many charitable and Islamic microfinance activities take place at the mosque as well. The Fajar or dawn prayers and the maghrib or dusk prayers sees big flocks small song birds visiting the flora. The mosque also sees many Christians from nearby churches who work with the Muslims on Islam. It serves Ramadan iftar. The mosque is maintained by the trust and through the efforts of the mosque management team that works around the clock to keep the mosque neat and clean at all times. It has security personnel. Facilities include parking for two wheelers, wadu khana, small and well maintained gardens, nikah, funerals, Islamic summer classes for children and Islamic education.

Others 

Zakaria Masjid, Bombay (Mumbai)
 Ismail Habib Masjid, Bombay (Mumbai)
 Minara Masjid, Bombay (Mumbai)
 Anderson Memon Masjid, Chennai
Jummah Masjid, Mauritius
 Nakhoda Masjid, Kolkata
 New Memon Masjid, Karachi
 Haji Sir Ismail Sait Masjid, Bangalore
 Memon Mosque, Pettah, Sri Lanka
 Jafar Jumma Masjid, Alappuzha, Kerala
 Memon Masjid, Mombasa, Kenya
 Kutchi Memon Masjid, Mangalore
Kutchi Memon Masjid, Saddar, Karachi (Kolachi)
Kutchi Memon Masjid, Gari Ahata, Karachi (Kolachi)
Nakhoda Masjid, Karachi (Kolachi)
Kutchi Memon Masjid, Qabrustan Ghans Mandi, Karachi (Kolachi)
Kutchi Memon Masjid, Ratan Talao, Karachi (Kolachi)

See also
 Sindhi Memon

References

External links 
 www.cutchimemonbangalore.com

 http://cutchimemonchennai.com

Memon
Social groups of Pakistan
Ethnic groups in Pakistan
Sindhi tribes
Muslim communities of India
Sindhi tribes in India
Social groups of Gujarat
Muslim communities of Gujarat
Tribes of Kutch